Denticetopsis praecox is a species of whale catfish endemic to Venezuela where it is known from the Baria River of the upper Rio Negro basin.  This species grows to a length of 5.3 cm (2.1 inches).

References 
 

Cetopsidae
Catfish of South America
Endemic fauna of Venezuela
Fish of Venezuela
Fish described in 1991